Bright As You is the second solo album by singer/songwriter Jason Harrod.

Track listing
 "The Sun Is Up" - 2:56
 "Kickin Mule" - 3:51
 "When I Fly Away" - 3:15
 "Messed Up Everywhere Blues" - 5:37
 "Bright As You" - 2:01
 "Night, Fall On Me" - 3:19
 "Voyeurs" - 3:41
 "My Mad Girlfriend" - 4:13
 "Good Night Sunshine" - 3:51
 "For Your Time" - 4:01

Jason Harrod albums
2005 albums